Poiret is a French language surname. Notable people with the surname include:

Jean Poiret, French author
Jean Louis Georges Poiret, former Lieutenant-Governor of Guinea
Jean Louis Marie Poiret, French clergyman, botanist, and explorer
Jeanne Poiret Boivin, French jewelry designer
Paul Poiret, French fashion designer

Surnames of French origin